Orion, also known as Prospect Ridge, is an unincorporated community in Pike County, Alabama, United States, located  north of Troy.

History
Originally called Prospect Ridge, the name was changed to Orion in honor of the constellation. Orion was incorporated on February 4, 1850, and the charter was repealed by the Alabama Legislature on February 26, 1881. A post office operated under the name Prospect Ridge from 1838 to 1848 and under the name Orion from 1848 to 1903.

Orion was home to the Orion Institute, one of the earliest schools in Pike County.

Jim Capers, the first African-American Revolutionary War soldier known to be buried in Alabama, is buried at Bethlehem Missionary Baptist Church in Orion.

Multiple structures in Orion were documented in the Historic American Buildings Survey.

Gallery

References

Unincorporated communities in Pike County, Alabama
Unincorporated communities in Alabama